Thurles railway station serves the town of Thurles in County Tipperary in Ireland. It has two through platforms and one terminating platform.

History

The Great Southern and Western Railway opened the station on 13 March 1848. The station was designed by Sancton Wood.

On 5 August that year William Smith O'Brien was arrested on the station while waiting for a train after an unsuccessful insurrection in Ballingarry in South Tipperary. There is a plaque at the station commemorating the event.

Following failure to pay a debt the Board of Works took over the line with operations handed to the W&LR until that was absorbed by the GS&WR in 1901.

On 9 December 1921, Old IRA members were being released during the Irish War of Independence. As internees reached Thurles railway station, a bomb was thrown at the train. Vol. Declan Hurton was injured and later died of his wounds.

CIÉ withdrew passenger services from the Thurles – Clonmel line in 1963 and closed the line to freight in 1967.

Thurles station has three times won the Irish Rail Best Intercity Station prize.

Bus Connections

Local Link
Local Link bus stops at Thurles Railway Station.

Timetable is 391 – (T42) Thurles to Limerick via Newport & UL

See also
 List of railway stations in Ireland

References

Bibliography

External links

Iarnród Éireann stations in County Tipperary
Railway stations opened in 1848
Railway stations in the Republic of Ireland opened in 1848